Avon is a suburb of the City of Wollongong and Wingecarribee Shire, both in New South Wales, Australia. It is "a locality within Metropolitan Catchment Area on the western side of Illawarra Range about 4km west of Wongawilli and about 5km north west of Avondale".

Heritage listings
Avon has a number of heritage-listed sites, including:
 Avon Dam Road: Avon Dam
 Avon Dam Road: Nepean Dam

References

Suburbs of Wollongong
City of Wollongong
Wingecarribee Shire